On 24 February 1996 a Cuban Air Force Mikoyan MiG-29UB shot down two unarmed Cessna 337 Skymaster aircraft operated by Brothers to the Rescue, an organization opposed to the Cuban government. The Organisation of American States (OAS) reported that no warning was given; Cuban government sources said "These people knew what they were doing. They were warned", and that the aircraft had entered Cuban airspace. All the occupants of the aircraft were killed: Carlos Costa, Armando Alejandre, Jr., Mario de la Peña, and Pablo Morales. A third Cessna involved escaped. Previous similar flights had released propaganda leaflets over Cuba.

 Radar data and screen prints were provided by a United States Customs Service Supervisory Detection Systems Specialist who recorded the entire incident as it happened using data from a U.S. surveillance radar balloon in the Florida Keys.

Description
On 24 February 1996, two of the Brothers to the Rescue Cessna 337 Skymasters (twin-engine civilian light aircraft) were shot down by a Cuban Air Force Mikoyan MiG-29UB, while a second jet fighter, a MiG-23, orbited nearby. All the occupants of the aircraft were killed: Carlos Costa, Armando Alejandre, Jr., Mario de la Peña and Pablo Morales. A third aircraft, flown by José Basulto, escaped. The first aircraft was shot down  outside Cuban territorial airspace, and the second was shot down  outside.

A military version of the Cessna 337, the Cessna O-2 Skymaster, had been retired in the late 1980s from military service, although two examples were kept mainly in storage by the US Army at the Yuma Testing Ground until 2010. Cuba claimed that the group used "planes previously employed in the wars in Vietnam and El Salvador given to them by the U.S. Air Force from which the "USAF" signs have not been completely erased."

The incident was investigated by the International Civil Aviation Organization (ICAO). Their report concluded that the authorities in Cuba had notified the authorities in the United States of multiple violations of their airspace since May 1994. In at least one case (13 July 1995), the pilot had released leaflets over Havana. The United States authorities had issued public statements advising of the potential consequences of unauthorized entry into Cuban airspace and had initiated legal actions against Basulto, but had retained his certification to fly during appeal. After Basulto was warned by an FAA official about the possibility of being shot down, he replied, "You must understand I have a mission in life to perform", disregarding the potential danger involved. He later said he considered the group's activities to be acts of civil disobedience against the regime, and a demonstration that such disobedience was possible.

According to Cuban authorities, two light aircraft entered Cuban territorial airspace on 9 and 13 January 1996, and released leaflets which fell on Cuban territory. According to the pilot of one of the aircraft, half a million leaflets were released on 13 January; he also claims they were released outside the  Cuban territorial limit and the wind carried them to Havana. This version of events was detailed by Juan Pablo Roque, the man who had returned to Cuba the day before the shootdown and who was later implicated as having helped organize the shootdown as a Cuban spy placed with the group.

Following that incident, the ICAO report states, the Commander of the Anti-Aircraft Defence of the Air Force of Cuba was instructed to intercept any further flights and was authorized to shoot them down, whether or not they had entered Cuban airspace.

On 24 February 1996, the group's aircraft flew another mission. While the Brothers to the Rescue aircraft were still north of the 24th parallel, the Cuban Air Force ordered the scrambling of two military aircraft, a MiG-29 and a MiG-23, operating under ground control.

The pilots identified the target as a Cessna 337 and requested authorization from military control,  who responded with "authorized to destroy." Two of the group's three aircraft flying that day were shot down.  According to the OAS report, there was no warning of any kind issued to the planes, nor the opportunity given to land. With the shooting down of each aircraft, the Cuban pilots could be heard celebrating over the radio. Terms like "cojones" were repeatedly used by the Cuban fighter pilots. Their radio transmissions included statements such as "We blew his balls off!" In a reference to the Cuban pilot's understanding that the aircraft they were attacking were the same ones that had been repeatedly and continuously flying directly over the island of Cuba beside all the buildings and over the streets, they also transmitted the following, "He won't give us any more fucking trouble." Finally, the Cuban pilots also said, "The other one is destroyed; the other one is destroyed. Homeland or death (patria o muerte), you bastards! The other one is also down." Military control stated "Congratulations to the pair of you."

Subsequently, the Inter-American Commission on Human Rights issued a report that concluded, "The fact that weapons of war and combat-trained pilots were used against unarmed civilians shows not only how disproportionate the use of force was, but also the intent to end the lives of those individuals. It is claimed the extracts from the radio communications between the MiG-29 pilots and the military control tower indicate that they acted from a superior position and showed malice and scorn toward the human dignity of the victims."

The third Brothers to the Rescue aircraft, with Basulto on board, was also identified for intercept and was to be shot down, but escaped.

The statement by Buchner is directly contradictory to eyewitness testimony and verified radar data documentation provided by Department of the Treasury, Supervisory Detection Systems Specialist J. Houlihan during sworn testimony before an FAA Administrative Hearing in 1996, and the House of Representatives, Subcommittee on the Western Hemisphere, Committee on International Relations, Washington D.C. September 18, 1996.

The ICAO report found that the aircraft shot down were both very near (and, in one case, directly above) a U.S fishing vessel named Tri-Liner which had a recorded position at the time of the incident  outside Cuban territorial airspace. Also nearby was the cruise ship Majesty of the Seas.

The ICAO report also states that means other than interception, such as radio communication, had been available to Cuba, but had not been utilized, and that this conflicts with the ICAO principle that interception of civil aircraft should be undertaken only as a last resort. It is also claimed the Cuban Air Force did not make any attempt to direct the aircraft beyond the boundaries of national airspace, guide them away from a prohibited, restricted or danger area or instruct them to effect a landing.

Reactions to the incident

International
Following the incident, the United Nations Security Council passed Security Council Resolution 1067 (1996), a U.S.-sponsored resolution condemning Cuba. Dissenting members believed that the resolution was singling out Cuba for condemnation, and instead should have issued a call which urged both states to refrain from shooting down civilian airplanes as well as to prevent the improper use of civil aviation.

United States
In Miami, reaction from the exile community was swift. Jorge Mas Canosa, co-founder and leader of the Cuban American National Foundation, condemned the attack: "For two warplanes from the Castro government to shoot down two unarmed civilian aircraft with American flags on a humanitarian mission should be considered an act of war against the US". President Bill Clinton issued Proclamation 6867 on March 1, 1996, declaring a national emergency by reason of a disturbance or threatened disturbance of international relations.

After the attack, the pilots responsible were the twin brothers, Teniente Coronel (LTC) Lorenzo Alberto Perez Perez and his "Guy in Back," Teniente Coronel (LTC) Francisco Perez Perez. Both were charged in the United States for their role in the attack.

Cuban response
Miguel Alfonso Martinez of the Cuban Foreign Ministry said that the two aircraft that were shot down were "not common civilian aircraft" as suggested by the US. "This is not the case of an innocent civilian airliner that, because of an instrument error, departs from an air corridor and gets into the airspace of another country". "These people knew what they were doing. They were warned. They wanted to take certain actions that were clearly intended to destabilize the Cuban government and the US authorities knew about their intentions".

Groups sympathetic to Cuba, while not approving the shootdown, noted "the policies of the United States government of indefensible hostility against the island of Cuba that sit at the heart of the matter", citing constant threats and a history of military and paramilitary attacks on Cuba from the US and paramilitary groups.

See also
 Cuban Five
 1997 Cuba hotel bombings

In popular culture

Film

 Documentary film Shoot Down, that illustrates the incident from the Brothers to the Rescue perspective, was released in 2006 and rereleased in an updated, edited version on January 25, 2008. It was directed by Cristina Khuly, niece of downed pilot Armando Alejandre, Jr.
 Wasp Network, 2019. Starring Penélope Cruz, Édgar Ramírez, Gael García Bernal, and Wagner Moura.

Literature

 Book: The Last Soldiers on the Cold War by Fernando Morais, 2011.

 Book: BETRAYAL: Cuba, Castro & The Cuban Five Thomas Van Hare and Matt Lawrence, 2010.

References

1996 in international relations
1996 in military history
1996 in politics
20th-century aircraft shootdown incidents
Aviation accidents and incidents in 1996
Combat incidents
Diplomatic incidents
Cuba–United States relations
1996 in Cuba
Mass murder in 1996
February 1996 events in North America